UFC Fight Night: Overeem vs. Sakai  (also known as UFC Fight Night 176, UFC on ESPN+ 34 and UFC Vegas 9) was a mixed martial arts event produced by the Ultimate Fighting Championship that took place on September 5, 2020 at the UFC Apex facility in Enterprise, Nevada, part of the Las Vegas Metropolitan Area, United States.

Background 
A heavyweight bout between the 2010 K-1 World Grand Prix Champion, former Strikeforce Heavyweight Champion and UFC Heavyweight Championship challenger Alistair Overeem and Augusto Sakai served as the event headliner.

A women's bantamweight bout between former UFC Women's Flyweight Champion Nicco Montaño and Julia Avila was originally scheduled for UFC Fight Night: Lewis vs. Oleinik. However, due to Montaño's coach John Wood testing positive for COVID-19, the bout was rescheduled for this event instead. In turn, it was announced on August 29 that Montaño herself tested positive for the disease and the bout was pushed back to UFC on ESPN: Holm vs. Aldana in October.

A women's flyweight bout between Maryna Moroz and Montana De La Rosa was scheduled for this event. However, Moroz was forced to withdraw as she was unable to secure a visa due to travel restrictions related to the COVID-19 pandemic and was replaced by Viviane Araújo.

A lightweight bout between Khama Worthy and Ottman Azaitar was previously scheduled to take place earlier this year at UFC 249. However, the event was cancelled in early April due to the COVID-19 pandemic. The pairing was rescheduled and took place at this event. In turn, the pair was moved to UFC Fight Night: Waterson vs. Hill for undisclosed reasons.

A women's flyweight bout between Mayra Bueno Silva and Mara Romero Borella was briefly linked to this event. However, promotion officials rescheduled the pairing for undisclosed reasons and the bout was expected to take place two weeks later at UFC Fight Night: Covington vs. Woodley.

A light heavyweight bout between former interim UFC Light Heavyweight Championship challenger Ovince Saint Preux and Alonzo Menifield was scheduled to take place two weeks earlier at UFC on ESPN: Munhoz vs. Edgar. However, the bout was removed from the card on the day of the event as Saint Preux tested positive for COVID-19. In turn, the pairing was targeted for this event.

A women's bantamweight bout between Macy Chiasson and Sijara Eubanks was scheduled for this event. However, Chiasson pulled out of the fight for undisclosed medical reasons and was replaced by Karol Rosa. Rosa pulled out on September 3 due to complications related to her weight cut. Eubanks is expected to compete a week later at UFC Fight Night: Waterson vs. Hill against Julia Avila.

A bantamweight bout between Ricky Simon and Brian Kelleher was scheduled for this event, but Simon's cornerman tested positive for COVID-19 and he was forced to withdraw from the event. He was replaced by promotional newcomer Kevin Natividad and they were expected to meet in a featherweight bout. In turn, Natividad was pulled from the matchup on the day of the event due to undisclosed reasons and replaced by fellow newcomer Ray Rodriguez, who weighed in as a backup on Friday.

A few hours before the event, American Top Team teammates Thiago Moisés and Marcos Rogério de Lima pulled out of their respective bouts at lightweight against Jalin Turner and heavyweight against Alexander Romanov due to testing positive for COVID-19, thus cancelling both matchups.

Due to the many unexpected changes and last minute cancellations, the event took place with only seven bouts on the card, making it the smallest UFC event since The Ultimate Fighter 2 Finale in November 2005.

Event
All the fights were on the main card due to the many cancellations and changes. The card consisted of 7 mixed martial arts bouts, which were scheduled for three five-minute rounds, except for the main event fight between Overeem and Sakai, which would consist of five five-minute rounds. The fights were held behind closed doors due to the COVID-19 pandemic at the UFC Apex in Las Vegas, and the event was broadcast on ESPN+.

Results

Bonus awards 
The following fighters received $50,000 bonuses.
Fight of the Night: No bonus awarded.
Performance of the Night: Ovince Saint Preux, Michel Pereira, André Muniz, and Brian Kelleher

See also 

 List of UFC events
 List of current UFC fighters
 2020 in UFC

References 

UFC Fight Night
2020 in mixed martial arts
2020 in sports in Nevada
Mixed martial arts in Las Vegas
Sports competitions in Las Vegas
September 2020 sports events in the United States